The World Taekwondo Junior Championships is a worldwide biennial championship organized for juniors age category by World Taekwondo, first held in 1996 in Barcelona. The event is contested every two years.

Editions

Medal table

See also
 World Taekwondo Championships
 World Cup Taekwondo Team Championships
 European Juniors Taekwondo Championships

References

External links 

 Official World Taekwondo website
 Official World Taekwondo Junior championships 2018 website

Taekwondo Junior
Taekwondo competitions
Taekwondo
Recurring sporting events established in 1996
World championships in combat sports
Biennial sporting events